Georgios Kostikos (Greek: Γεώργιος Κωστίκος; born 26 April 1958) is a Greek former professional footballer.

Playing career

Club
Kostikos began playing football with Pierikos in 1975, and two years later he was acquired by PAOK. He played for PAOK from 1977 to 1986, before finishing his career with Olympiacos and Diagoras. He won the 1985 Greek league title with PAOK.

International
Kostikos made 35 appearances and scored three goals for the Greece national football team from 1977 to 1984. He also participated in UEFA Euro 1980.

Managerial career
In 2006, after the dismissal of PAOK coach, Mr. Karageorgiou, Kostikos took over the team as a temporary coach. After Kostikos successfully led PAOK to qualify to the UEFA Cup Groups, PAOK's president Yannis Goumenos, announced that Kostikos will be the coach of PAOK. For the year 2007–2008 Kostikos managed Nea Salamina of Famagusta in Cyprus.

Honours
PAOK
Alpha Ethniki
Champion (1): 1984–85
Runner-up (1): 1977–78
Greek Cup
Runner-up (4): 1977–78, 1980–81, 1982–83, 1984–85

Olympiacos
Alpha Ethniki
Champion (1): 1986–87

References

External links

1958 births
Living people
Greek footballers
Greece international footballers
Pierikos F.C. players
PAOK FC players
Olympiacos F.C. players
Greek football managers
Expatriate football managers in Cyprus
PAOK FC managers
UEFA Euro 1980 players
Super League Greece players
Ethnikos Piraeus F.C. managers
Kozani F.C. managers
Nea Salamis Famagusta FC managers
Pontic Greeks
Soviet people of Greek descent
Uzbekistani people of Greek descent
Sportspeople from Tashkent
PAOK FC non-playing staff
Footballers from Katerini
Association football forwards